Bishops of the Roman Catholic Archdiocese of Szczecin-Kamień:

Diocesan bishops of Szczecin-Kamień diocese (1972–1992)

1972–1978 – Jerzy Stroba
1978–1992 – Kazimierz Majdański

Metropolitan archbishop of Szczecin-Kamień diocese (from 1992)

1992–1999 – Marian Przykucki
1999–2009 – Zygmunt Kamiński
2009–present – Andrzej Dzięga

Suffragan bishop of Szczecin-Kamień diocese

1974–1992 – Jan Gałecki
1980–1992 – Stanisław Stefanek
1989–1992 – Marian Kruszyłowicz

Suffragan bishop of Szczecin-Kamień archdiocese

1992–2007 – Jan Gałecki
1992–1996 – Stanisław Stefanek
1992–2013 – Marian Kruszyłowicz
 since 2014 – Henryk Wejman

See also
Previous Catholic dioceses in Pomerania:
Diocese of Kołobrzeg (Kolberg, 1000–1005), bishop Reinbern
Bishopric of Cammin (1140–1650)
Pomeranian Evangelical Church

Sz

de:Erzbistum Stettin-Cammin